John Patrick Caulfield (born 1951) is the former Chief of the U.S. Interests Section in Cuba, a position he held from September 2011 to July 2014. Caulfield now works as an independent consultant and an advisor to the Innovadores Foundation.

In September 2008, Caulfield acted as the chargé d'affaires at the American embassy in Venezuela after Ambassador Patrick Duddy was expelled by then-president Hugo Chávez. He resumed the post from July 2010 through July 2011.

Caulfield served in the state department for over 30 years in a variety of posts, including consul general at the American embassy in London and deputy chief of mission at the American embassy in Lima, Peru. Caulfield is a graduate of Saint Joseph's University with a degree in international relations and Latin American studies.

See also
Cuban Thaw

References 

1951 births
Living people
Ambassadors of the United States to Cuba
Saint Joseph's University alumni